Jules-Cyrille Cavé (January 4, 1859 – May 12, 1949) was a French painter.

Life 
Jules-Cyrille Cavé was born in Paris. He studied with Tony Robert-Fleury, a painter of the historical genre and professor at the Académie Julian, and with William-Adolphe Bouguereau, one of the greatest salon painters of the 19th century. Bouguereau was to be a significant influence throughout Cavé's career, both stylistically and in terms of subject matter and treatment.

Since 1885, Cavé took part in the Salon des Artistes Français every year. He mainly exhibited floral and portrait pieces as well as historical compositions, of which Martyre aux catacombes (1886), Première gelée (1891), Moisson de fleurs (1899), Fleurs des Champs (1905), and two portraits of women (1909) can be proven. Cavé had early success in 1886 when he was awarded a 3rd class medal for Martyre aux catacombes. From 1887 he was a member of the Société des Artistes Français and the Comité de l'Association Taylor. He received further awards and bronze medals in 1889 and 1900. He painted portraits, religious, and allegorical motifs in the style of salons, young girls, genres, and still lifes. Cavé's portraits of young girls and allegorical motifs were very well painted in Bouguereau's manner and found success in France and the United States.

Gallery

References 

French artists
French male painters
1859 births
1949 deaths
19th-century French painters
20th-century French painters
19th-century French male artists